The Tianguis Cultural del Chopo is a Saturday flea market (tianguis in Mexican Spanish) near Mexico City downtown, known locally as El Chopo. It is named after its original location which was near the Museo Universitario del Chopo, an art deco building with a couple of towers designed by Bruno Möhring. Depending on the affiliation one has with this event, it has been referred to as "The Punk Market", "The Metal Market", or "The Goth Market". Since the end of the 1980s, the Tianguis del Chopo has been at a location very near subway station Metro Buenavista in the street of Aldama in the Colonia Guerrero neighborhood.

Originally, the Tianguis was a place for hippies to trade 1960s memorabilia including not only records but also clothing, magazines, books and other collectibles. Eventually, the Tianguis has also given place to more recent musical styles like metal, goth, punk, grunge and ska, among others. Almost always, some local and touring bands play live gigs at the back of the market, where can also be found the casual traders standing and looking up for that rare and collectable record or CDs. The market is also an opportunity to enrich the local alternative scene as well as to come dressed in authentic subculture styles.

On the northern end of the market at Aldama and Camelia is an area called Espacio Anarcho-punk. Vendors in this part of El Chopo sell mostly books, movies, and other materials that have an anarchist or radical perspective.  Many of the Espacio Anarcho-Punk vendors contribute to a weekly zine of the same title addressing local social issues and radical politics.

References 

Retail markets in Mexico City
Flea markets
Cuauhtémoc, Mexico City